Kuldip Singh (born 1 January 1932) is an Indian attorney and a former judge of the Supreme Court of India. Following his retirement from the Supreme Court, he headed the Delimitation Commission of 2002 that was tasked with redrawing the boundaries of the various assembly and Lok Sabha constituencies based on the 2001 census.

Singh received his education from Col. Brown Cambridge School, followed by his first law degree from Punjab University in 1955 and a second one from the University of London in 1958. He served as a barrister-at-law at Lincoln's Inn in London before returning to India in 1959.

Singh was appointed to the Supreme Court on 14 December 1988 and retired on 21 December 1996.

Notes

Further reading
 
 

1932 births
Living people
Punjabi people
Justices of the Supreme Court of India
Judges of the Punjab and Haryana High Court
20th-century Indian judges